Digamasellus is a genus of mites in the family Digamasellidae. There are at least three described species in Digamasellus.

Species
These three species belong to the genus Digamasellus:
 Digamasellus australis Lindquist, 1975
 Digamasellus punctum (Berlese, 1904)
 Digamasellus variabilis Wisniewski & Hirschmann, 1989

References

Mesostigmata